The Fédération Internationale des Associations de Footballeurs Professionnels (English: International Federation of Professional Footballers), generally referred to as FIFPRO, is the worldwide representative organisation for 65,000 professional footballers. FIFPRO, with its global headquarters in Hoofddorp, Netherlands, is made up of 66 national players' associations. In addition, there are four candidate members. Lionel Messi have the most appearances in the FIFPRO World 11 with 16 appearances, whereas Cristiano Ronaldo has had 15 appearances occupying the second place.

History 
On 15 December 1965, representatives of the French, Scottish, English, Italian and Dutch players' associations met in Paris, with the objective of setting up an international federation for footballers. In the second half of June 1966, the first FIFPRO congress took place in London, just before the start of the 1966 FIFA World Cup. The articles of association of FIFPRO were thereby adopted and the objectives accurately laid down. FIFPRO was responsible for increasing the solidarity between professional footballers and players' associations.

It was originally laid down that a congress would be held once every four years at a minimum. The latest congress was in Uruguay in October 2022.

FIFPRO has grown from a European organisation into a global network and has done much to support countries on other continents – Asia/Oceania, Africa, and North, Central and South America – in their efforts to set up players' associations.

FIFPRO tried to offer the players' associations or other interest associations the means for mutual consultation and co-operation to achieve their objectives. In addition, it wished to co-ordinate the activities of the different affiliated groups in order to promote the interests of all professional footballers. Indeed, FIFPRO likewise had in mind propagating and defending the rights of professional footballers. The emphasis was thereby laid on the freedom of the football player to be able to choose the club of his choice at the end of his contract. FIFPRO supported Belgian footballer Jean-Marc Bosman in his judicial challenge of the football transfer rules which led to the Bosman ruling in 1995.

In 2013, FIFPRO launched a legal challenge against the transfer system. Phillipe Piat, the FIFPRO president at the time, said "the transfer system fails 99% of players around the world, it fails football as an industry and it fails the world's most beloved game". According to the President of FIFPRO Division Europe Bobby Barnes, 28% of the money from a transfer fee is paid to agents, and that many players are not paid on time or at all. He claims this leads to these players being "vulnerable targets of crime syndicates, who instigate match-fixing and threaten the very existence of credible football competitions". Writing for the BBC, Matt Slater said "professional footballers do not enjoy the same freedoms that almost every other EU worker does", and that "players look at US sport, and wonder why their career prospects are still constrained by transfer fees and compensation costs".

In recent years, FIFPRO has established itself as a leading reference in the football industry through player surveys and research into concussion, mental health, social media abuse, player workload monitoring, and more.

FIFPRO looks into securing a safe workspace for players, promoting their rights as ordinary workers. FIFPRO introduced new regulations to protect the rights of current and prospective mothers. These minimum conditions, agreed upon by FIFA and other governing bodies, offer women more job security and came into effect as of 1 January 2021.

In the last five years, FIFPRO has repeatedly intervened to protect and enforce the rights of players to participate in an environment free from sexual misconduct, harassment, and abuse. FIFPRO is a firm advocate of ensuring that all people, including players, should be guaranteed and protected by human rights. In 2021, FIFPRO played an active role in the group evacuation of women's footballers and athletes from Afghanistan.

Current board 

The FIFPRO Executive Board consists of 18 members, including president David Aganzo, for the term 2021–2025. He has been president since the FIFPRO Congress in Paris in November 2021. Following the statutory reforms established in February 2021, the board increased in size as well as in diversity, making space for new voices and instituting a mandatory minimum threshold of 33 percent for the least-represented gender:
 President: David Aganzo
 Vice Presidents: Camila Garcia and Geremi
 Board Members: Khadija Timera, Alejandro Sequeira, Carlos Gonzalez Puche, Fernando Revilla, Kathryn Gill, Izham Ismail, Caroline Jonsson, Dejan Stefanovic, Karin Sendel, Lucien Valloni, Mila Hristova, David Terrier, Bobby Barnes, Stefano Sartori, Louis Everard
 General Secretary: Jonas Baer-Hoffmann

Members 
Founded on 15 December 1965, FIFPRO has 66 full members and 3 candidate members. Upon graduation to the next level, new members sign an affiliation agreement that promotes loyalty, integrity and fairness as well as principles of good governance, including open and transparent communications, democratic processes, checks and balances, solidarity and corporate social responsibility.

Full members 

  Argentina
  Australia
  Austria
  Belgium
  Bolivia
  Bosnia and Herzegovina
  Botswana
  Bulgaria
  Cameroon
  Chile
  Colombia
  Costa Rica
  Croatia
  Cyprus
  Czech Republic
  Denmark
  DR Congo
  Egypt
  England
  Finland
  France
  Gabon
  Ghana
  Greece
  Guatemala
  Honduras
  Hungary
  Indonesia
  India
  Ireland
  Israel
  Italy
  Japan
  Kenya
  Malaysia
  Malta
  Mexico
  Montenegro
  Morocco
  Netherlands
  New Zealand
  North Macedonia
  Norway
  Panama
  Paraguay
  Peru
  Poland
  Portugal
  Qatar
  Romania
  Scotland
  Serbia
  Slovakia
  Slovenia
  South Africa
  South Korea
  Spain
  Sweden
  Switzerland
  Turkey
  Ukraine
  United States
  Uruguay
  Venezuela
  Zambia
  Zimbabwe

Candidate members 
None

FIFA FIFPRO World 11 

FIFPRO invites all professional men's and women's footballers to compose the best men's and women's teams of the year, named the FIFPRO World 11 (also known as the FIFPRO World XI). In 2009, the world players' union joined hands with FIFA. While the format remained the same, the award name changed to the FIFA FIFPRO World 11.

Every year, FIFPRO and approximately 70 affiliated players unions distribute unique links that give players from all professional football clubs on the planet access to the digital voting platform. An initial 23-person squad then reveals the nominees. The goalkeeper, as well as the three defenders, three midfielders and three forwards who receive the most votes are then selected for the World 11. The remaining spot is assigned to the outfield player with the next highest number of votes who is not selected already. The 11-person FIFA FIFPRO World 11 is revealed at The Best FIFA Football Awards (formerly the FIFA Ballon d'Or).

From 2005 until 2008, FIFPRO also asked footballers to choose the FIFPRO World Player of the Year. From 2009 on, the election for FIFPRO Player of the Year merged with the FIFA World Player of the Year, and in 2010 combined with France Football's Ballon d'Or into one award, the FIFA Ballon d'Or.

In 2014, FIFPRO launched a women's football committee.
In February 2016, the FIFPRO Women's World 11 was launched. Players of 33 different nationalities in over 20 countries participated in voting for one goalkeeper, four defenders, three midfielders and three forwards. As of 2019, the FIFPRO Women's World 11 is also revealed on stage during The Best FIFA Football Awards.

FIFA FIFPRO Men's World 11

Winners 
Players marked bold won the FIFA World Player of the Year (2005–2009), the FIFA Ballon d'Or (2010–2015) or The Best FIFA Men's Player (2016–present) in that respective year.

Appearances by player

Appearances by club 
Players in italics have made appearances with multiple clubs, and appearances are separated accordingly.

Appearances by nationality

Regional appearances

FIFA FIFPRO Women's World 11

Winners 
Players marked bold won the FIFA World Player of the Year (2001–2015) or The Best FIFA Women's Player (2016–present) in that respective year.

Appearances by player

Appearances by club 
Players in italics have made appearances with multiple clubs, and appearances are separated accordingly.

Appearances by nationality

Regional appearances

FIFPRO World Player of the Year (2005–2008) 

FIFPRO granted this award from 2005 to 2008; in 2009 it merged with the FIFA World Player of the Year, which was succeeded by the FIFA Ballon d'Or in 2010 and later The Best FIFA Men's Player in 2016.

FIFPRO Young Player of the Year (2005–2008) 

FIFPRO granted this award from 2005 to 2008, after which it was discontinued. (Players born after 1985)

Social impact awards

FIFPRO Merit Awards

In  2008 FIFPRO established its Meirt Award, to recognise professional footballers who have made a singnificant contribution to a charitable cause and are socially engaged. It honours players who use their platform to take action to improve their lives of people in need. The award is worth US$25,000 (as of 2018). Winners of the FIPRO Merit Award include:
 2008 – Ibrahim Kargbo (Sierra Leone), ambassador of the Care Foundation in Sierra Leone
 2009 – Shabani Nonda (DR Congo), for his foundation that organised annual football tournaments for 350 poor children in Kinshasa, and for his payment of school supplies and school fees, and for organising a Match for Peace (featuring other DR Congo players) to raise funds for victims of violence
 2010 – Steven Bryce and Reynaldo Parks (Costa Rica), for their project to help children and young people in deprived neighbourhoods
 2011 – Peres Center for Peace (Israel), for its Twinned Peace Sport Schools project, which annually engages thousands of children from Israel and the Palestinian Authority, and promotes peace between Israelis and Palestinians
 2012 – Japan Pro-Footballers Association (JPFA), for their charity work for the victims of the 2011 Japanese tsunami
 2013 – Stiliyan Petrov (Bulgaria), for his leukaemia foundation
 2014 – Héctor Santibanez, for a football school for children with Down syndrome
 2015 – Kei Kamara and Michael Lahoud (Sierra Leone), for Schools for Salone, a charity that builds schools
 2016 – Haley Carter (USA), for raising support for the Afghan women's team
 2017 – Mihai Nesu (Romania), for building a recovery centre for disabled children
 2018 – Awer Mabil (Australia), for his charity Barefoot to Boots, providing essentials and football equipment for children in Kakuma refugee camp, Kenya
 2019 – Johanna Omolo (Kenya), for his foundation that supplies poor children with essentials in Dandora, Kenya

In 2020 the format changed, and four awards were given:
 Player Activism: a player who advocates for a cause to bring about political or social change
 Player Impact: a player acts to create a positive impact in others' lives
 Player Voice: players who use their platform to raise their voice (and sometimes others) to create awareness of help bring about change with regard to an issue within the football industry
 FIFPRO Hero: a player who has done something extraordinary and special, needing acknowledgement by FIFPRO

2020
 Player Activism: Javiera Moreno, for fighting sexual abuse in women's football
 Player Impact: Marcus Rashford, for organising free school meals for disadvantaged children in the UK
 Player Voice: Cyprus Women's National Team, for advocacy for equality in Cypriot football
 FIFPRO Hero: Aidana Otorbaeva, for organising volunteers to help in hospitals during the COVID-19 pandemic

In 2022, FIFPRO introduced the Union Impact Award, to recognise outstanding work done by unions on the ground to support players.

See also 
 FIFA Ballon d'Or
 Ballon d'Or
 FIFA World Player of the Year
 The Best FIFA Football Awards
 UEFA Team of the Year

References

External links 

 
 FIFA FIFPRO World 11 - Award History FIFPRO World Players' Union

Association football trade unions
Global union federations
Sports organizations established in 1965
Trade unions established in 1965
1965 establishments in France